Mohammad Ali Asfanani is an Iranian jurist and politician. He was a member of the 9th Islamic Consultative Assembly.During his time in parliament, he was a member of the Judiciary Commission.

Asfanani was born in 1968 in Fereydunshahr. He is of Georgian descent and Iranian citizenship and speaks Persian and Georgian fluently. He is also familiar with English and Arabic languages.

References 

Living people
Iranian people of Georgian descent
Members of the 9th Islamic Consultative Assembly
20th-century Iranian lawyers
Iranian politicians
1968 births